Alan, Allan, or Allen Segal, Siegal, or Siegel may refer to: 

Abe Segal (Alan Abraham Segal, 1930–2016), South African tennis player
Allan Segal (1941–2012), British documentary film maker
Alan F. Segal (1945–2011), American scholar of ancient religions
Allan M. Siegal (1940–2022), American journalist
Alan Siegel (born 1938), American businessman